Edward Gustaw Adolf Luckhaus (31 August 1910 – 12 May 1975) was a Polish athlete of German ethnicity. He competed in the men's triple jump at the 1936 Summer Olympics.

During World War II he volunteered to Wehrmacht, fought on the Eastern Front and was taken as prisoner of war, being incarcerated in the POW camp in Gomel. After being released in 1948, he moved to Bavaria, where he lived with his family in Pfaffenhofen near Munich. He worked as a physical education teacher initially in the Benedictine monastery in Scheyern, later at the gymnasium in Pfaffenhofen.

References

1910 births
1975 deaths
People from Hlukhiv
People from Glukhovsky Uyezd
People from the Russian Empire of German descent
Polish people of German descent
Polish male triple jumpers
Polish male javelin throwers
Jagiellonia Białystok athletes
Olympic athletes of Poland
Athletes (track and field) at the 1936 Summer Olympics
German military personnel of World War II
German prisoners of war in World War II held by the Soviet Union